= Sanitation syndrome =

Segregationist theory in South Africa

Sanitation syndrome is a way of describing a trend in segregationist thought in South Africa. The theory of sanitation syndrome was first advanced by Maynard Swanson in his frequently cited 1977 paper, "The Sanitation Syndrome: Bubonic Plague and Urban Native Policy in the Cape Colony, 1900-1909". In his paper, Swanson argued that in pre-union South Africa, public officials became influenced by an imagery of infectious disease as a societal metaphor, and that this mirrored and influenced developments in segregation. He also asserted that his theory may be applicable to situations outside of his study, and it has since been applied to numerous other instances of segregation.

== Background ==
English administrators of South African cities had long expressed their racially tinged concerns about the cleanliness of majority nonwhite neighborhoods. In the year 1900, the bubonic plague arrived in several South African port cities, prompting drastic, racially motivated responses from administrators. For example, the Plague Administration of Cape Town relocated over six thousand Black and Coloured South Africans from their homes within the city into hastily constructed shelters near a "sewage farm" in 1901. During that time, there were slightly more cases of bubonic plague among whites than black Africans in Cape Town. The effect of this separation, as well as similar policies across major South African cities, was the highly segregated urban landscape of South African cities in the twentieth century.

== Swanson's theory ==
Swanson argued that white South Africans associated the bubonic plague with black Africans because of sanitation syndrome. "Sanitizing" a neighborhood did not mean improving hygiene, living conditions, and access to medical care. Instead, it meant removing non-white residents from the neighborhood altogether. As a result, administrators were able to fully segregate entire cities. The theory of sanitation syndrome implicated urban whites in creating segregated cities in South Africa, as many of the people causing and complicit with the forced relocations were members of the urban middle and upper classes. It argued that scientific language could be used to justify socially motivated policies, despite scientific evidence indicating that those policies would not be effective, and how scientific investigation could be directed along political and social goals. This theory has been applied numerous times, such as in Patterson and Packard's White Plague, Black Labor and B. Freund's The African City: A History. The paper has been cited 589 times, according to Google Scholar.

== Criticisms ==
Historians such as Marc Epprecht have criticized the theory of sanitation syndrome as veering towards oversimplification. Specifically, Epprecht criticized how Swanson fails to examine Africans' attitudes towards, and possible participation in, sanitation syndrome. Despite this, authors continue to see "sanitation syndrome" as a useful and accurate way of thinking about segregation.
